In ancient Roman religion, Averruncus or Auruncus is a god of averting harm. Aulus Gellius says that he is one of the potentially malignant deities who must be propitiated for their power to both inflict and withhold disaster from people and the harvests.

Although the etymology of the name is often connected to the Latin verb avertere, "to turn away," a more probable origin lies in averro "to sweep away," hence averrunco, "to ward off," perhaps with a reference to magical sweeping. Varro asserts that the infinitive verb averruncare shares its etymology with the god whose primary function is averting. Averruncus may be among the indigitamenta pertaining to another god such as Apollo or Mars, that is, it may be a name to be used in a prayer formulary to fix the local action of the invoked deity. Precise naming, in connection with concealing a deity's true name to monopolize his or her power, was a crucial part of prayer in antiquity, as evidenced not only in the traditional religions of Greece and Rome and syncretistic Hellenistic religion and mystery cult, but also in Judaism and ancient Egyptian religion.

In other references, Averruncus is also known as the god of childbirth.

References

Roman gods
Fortune gods
Childhood gods
Personifications in Roman mythology